Glebe High School may refer to:
 Glebe Collegiate Institute, Ottawa, Canada
 A former name for a school which was merged to become the Blackwattle Bay Campus of Sydney Secondary College, Sydney, Australia